Admiral Sir John Fitzroy Duyland Bush  (1 November 1914 – 10 May 2013) was a British Royal Navy officer who served as Commander-in-Chief Western Fleet.

Naval career 
Educated at Clifton College, Bush was commissioned into the Royal Navy and served in World War II. He became Commanding officer of the destroyer HMS Undine as well as Captain of the 6th Frigate Squadron in 1955, Flag Officer (Flotillas) in the Mediterranean Fleet in 1961 and then Commander of the British Naval staff in Washington D. C. in 1962.

In January 1967 he led a British delegation to South Africa to renegotiate the Simonstown Agreement.

He was appointed Vice Chief of the Naval Staff in 1965 and the first Commander-in-Chief Western Fleet in 1967. He retired in 1970.

In retirement he held the posts of Rear-Admiral and then Vice-Admiral of the United Kingdom. He was one of the inaugural members of East Hampshire District Council after its creation in 1973. He died on 10 May 2013.

Family 
In 1938 he married Ruth Kennedy Horsey; they went on to have three sons and two daughters.

References

External links
Royal Navy Officers 1939−1945

|-

|-

|-

1914 births
2013 deaths
Knights Grand Cross of the Order of the Bath
People educated at Clifton College
Recipients of the Distinguished Service Cross (United Kingdom)
Royal Navy admirals
Royal Navy officers of World War II